The Silverado Fire was a wildfire that burned in October and November 2020 in southern Orange County, California northeast of Irvine. Orange County Fire Authority Chief Brian Fennessy stated, "The winds were extraordinary even by Santa Ana standards. Fire spread is exceeding more than anything I've seen in my 44 years." The fire initially moved south from Loma Ridge toward the Orchard Hills, Northwood and Portola Springs communities of Irvine before moving southeast through Limestone Canyon and toward the communities of Foothill Ranch and Lake Forest. The fire burned in a path similar to that taken by the 2007 Santiago Fire, mostly through terrain that had not seen significant burning in the 13 years since that fire. 100% containment was announced on November 7, 2020.

The cause of the fire remains under investigation. Southern California Edison officials stated in a letter to the California Public Utilities Commission that they suspect a "lashing wire" in one of their telecommunication lines may have caused the fire.

Timeline
Mandatory evacuation orders were issued by the Orange County Fire Authority and CalFire for approximately 90,000 residents and schools in the area. The fire also caused California State Route 241 to temporarily shut down.

Although there were no civilian casualties, two Orange County firefighters, 26 year old Dylan Van Iwaarden and 31 year old Phi Le, were severely burned battling the wildfire, receiving second and third degree burns over half their bodies and hospitalized in critical condition. Van Iwaarden had burns on 65% of his body and Le had burns on 50% of his body. The firefighters were reportedly trapped by flames in what may have been a failed backburning attempt. Six other firefighters in the same crew reported singes to their hair and eyebrows. A socially distant blood drive was held in Santa Ana to help the firefighters, and over $215,000 was raised in two days via online crowdsourcing to aid with medical expenses.

On November 7, firefighters reached 100% containment of the fire. 

On February 17, 2021, firefighter Dylan Van Iwaarden was released from the Orange County Global Medical Center in Santa Ana after spending 114 days there, undergoing a medically induced coma and 17 surgeries.

Impact
The fire consumed 13,390 acres, destroying one structure and two minor structures, and damaging five others. The burn scar of the fire aided in the stoppage of the Bond Fire, another wildfire that took place in the area only a month later.

The fire partially destroyed a 6.1-acre area along Agua Chinon Creek and around Limestone Canyon Regional Park that had recently been the subject of a five-year project to restore the nature to its native setting. The seed farm facility used for the project was also burned during the wildfire. Some trees and vegetation were burned while others weren't in what officials described as a "checkerboard pattern" of damage.

The burn scars of the Silverado and Bond fires coupled with a winter rain storm caused a series of mudflows on the evening of January 28, 2021. Mudflows occurred near the Bond Fire scar causing road blockages; however, structural damages were not reported in the Silverado Fire burn scar area.

Gallery

See also

References

External links
 Crews battle wind-driven Silverado Fire in Orange County; evacuations ordered for parts of Irvine (KTLA channel 5 Los Angeles).
 Silverado Fire Forces Evacuations in Orange County Area (KNBC channel 4 Los Angeles)
 CALFIRE Incident Page (CALFIRE)

Wildfires in Orange County, California
2020 California wildfires
October 2020 events in the United States